Get Up On The Raft is the self-released fourth album recorded by Liam Lynch, released in 2008 on digital format only.

Background
The album was recorded throughout 2007 and 2008 by Lynch, and the first songs shown were "Get Up On The Raft" and "Things Have Changed" in episode 19 of Lynch's podcast in 2007. Get Up On The Raft differs in style from his previous album, How to Be a Satellite as the album centres around an alternative rock style and How to Be a Satellite covered a wider spectrum of genres. According to Lynch the album is less cryptic than his previous albums and is centered on his past relationships.

Track listing
All Songs were written by Liam Lynch

"Get Up on the Raft"
"Hit Me Again"
"Demolition"
"I Came to Fall"
"Tracing the Shape"
"The Wind"
"Rivers Slip"
"It's Not Over"
"Things Have Changed"
"Let's Shine"
"I'm Not Ready"
"Light of Day"
"Exhibits"
"Safe and Nowhere"
"You're an Arrow"

Liam Lynch (musician) albums
2008 albums